The filmography of Eva Krížiková chronicles her film work through the artist's 60 years as a motion picture actress.  She initially entered the film industry through a minor, backup role in Paľo Bielik's work The Mountains Are Stirring  from 1952. Her first starring role came shortly after that, in Friday the 13th (1953), also by Bielik. However Krížiková has been cast in only eighteen feature films in total, her name has been credited in over 500 productions made for television, 123 of which represent TV films and/or series.

Filmography

Feature films

Television

TV films

TV series

Other appearances

Voice acting roles

Televised theater

References
General

Specific

External links 

 Eva Krížiková at SND
 Eva Krížiková at ČSFd
 Eva Krížiková at IMDb
 Eva Krížiková at SFd
 Eva Krížiková at FilmovaMista.cz
 Eva Krížiková at KinoBox
 Eva Krížiková at Osobnosti.sk

Actress filmographies